Cecilie Cottis Østreng (born 1967) is a Norwegian lyricist.

Her debut collection Om hvor langt det er til Ullern issued on Tiden (2013) was reviewed in Morgenbladet, Klassekampen, Aftenposten and Stavanger Aftenblad. Her sophomore Mingvasevann (Tiden, 2015) was reviewed in Dagsavisen, Aftenposten and Morgenbladet.

References

1967 births
Living people
Norwegian poets
Norwegian women writers